Somsak Sithchatchawal (born July 17, 1977) is a Thai former professional boxer who competed from 1995 to 2010. He held the WBA super-bantamweight title in 2006.

In March 2006, Sithchatchawal took part in what later won Ring Magazine fight of the year when he challenged WBA Super Bantamweight champion Mahyar Monshipour. Sithchatchawal dropped Monshipour in the first round, and won via TKO in the 10th round to capture the belt. Sithchatchawal lost his WBA world super-bantamweight belt to Celestino Caballero in Sithchatchawal's native country of Thailand on October 4, 2006. Caballero won by TKO by knocking Sithchatchawal down three times in the third round—causing the referee to cease the bout.

His record is 46-2-1-1 (37 KOs). He is a former WBA world super bantamweight champion.

The September 15, 2008, split decision 8th round win of Filipino Joel De La Cruz over Somsak Sithchatchawal, at the Cebu Coliseum, was officially amended to a draw due to apparent error in scorecards tally. Cebu Games and Amusements Board explained that "there was no problem on the scorecards of 3 judges -- Edward Ligas and Salven Lagumbay of the Philippines and Saween Taweekon of Thailand -- after 7 rounds. But, at the end of round 8, Mendoza admitted he thought the 10-9 score in favor of de La Cruz was by Lagumbay and not from the Thai judge. The GAB made the correction and instead of a win, de La Cruz had to settle for a draw. Mendoza said the scorecards read Ligas, 77-74, in favor of de La Cruz, Lagumbay, 76-75, in favor of Somsak while the Thai judge scored it 76-76."

References

External links 
 

1977 births
Living people
Super-bantamweight boxers
World super-bantamweight boxing champions
World Boxing Association champions
Somsak Sithchatchawal
Somsak Sithchatchawal